Pablo César Reinoso Ojeda (born 18 December 1985) is a Chilean footballer as a goalkeeper.

Born in Llay Llay, Reinoso began his career at the youth ranks of Colo-Colo. After of fail to be promoted to Colo-Colo's first team, in January 2005, he try out with Chilean Primera División professional team Deportes Puerto Montt and was signed by that club. After of only play three games with Puerto Montt during the seasons 2005 and 2006, Reinoso was released of the club. In July of the same year, he joined amateur club Rayo del Pacífico.

After of play for clubs of second division like San Luis Quillota and Naval, Reinoso in December 2009, was signed by Audax Italiano. In 2011, he abandoned the club and joined to Unión Española as back-up for Eduardo Lobos.

Club career

Early career
Born in Llay Llay, Reinoso traveled to Santiago for began his career ar Colo-Colo football academy at very young age. After years in the academy, he fail to be promoted to the first adult team.

In January 2005, aged 19, Reinoso joined as professional player to the Chilean Primera División club Deportes Puerto Montt as back-up of the first-choice goalkeeper Carlos Espinoza. His opportunities in the team were very limited, due to the good performances of his teammate Espinoza in the goal. Remaining until May 2006 in the city of Puerto Montt, after his bad spell in that club, Reinoso joined Tercera División amateur club Rayo del Pacífico. After spells in San Luis Quillota in the 2007 and Trasandino in the next season, he moved to Naval in January 2009.

Audax Italiano
On 3 December 2009, Reinoso was signed by Audax Italiano, after of try out with the team. After of his success being accepted as the second-choice keeper of the club, he very proud said that: "It's a very nice challenge for me play in Audax", adding that will learn much next to a referent like Jhonny Herrera.

On 25 January 2010, he debuted for Audax in a match against Ñublense, in where he shot to notoriety for conceding seven goals in his first game with the club. The same game he received goals two goals of Gabriel Rodríguez and one of Sebastián Malandra, Pablo González, José Luis Muñoz and Luis Núñez. Not obstant, he failed to make another appearance for the Primera División Tournament, due to the excellent performances of the first-choice keeper of the club, Jhonny Herrera, playing only that game against Ñublense. Following the departure of Herrera, Reinoso played the first three games of the 2011 Apertura Tournament, until the arrival of the Argentine keeper Alejandro Sánchez against Palestino, Universidad Católica and Cobresal. For the Clausura Tournament, Reinoso not played none match, due to the consecration of Sánchez in the goal.

Unión Española
On 31 December 2011, Reinoso joined to Audax's rival side Unión Española, due to the lack of keepers in the position, after the departures of Federico Elduayen and Rainer Wirth. He began to training with the team on 3 January 2012.

References

External links
 
 Pablo Reinoso at Football-Lineups
 P. Reinoso at Goal.com
 Unión Española Profile 

1985 births
Living people
Chilean footballers
Chilean Primera División players
Audax Italiano footballers
Unión Española footballers
Primera B de Chile players
Puerto Montt footballers
Trasandino footballers
Naval de Talcahuano footballers
Association football goalkeepers
People from San Felipe de Aconcagua Province